Bhoothnath is a 2008 Indian Hindi-language supernatural comedy film written and directed by Vivek Sharma, starring Amitabh Bachchan, Juhi Chawla, Aman Siddiqui, Priyanshu Chatterjee and Rajpal Yadav and features Shah Rukh Khan in a cameo appearance. The film is an adaptation of Oscar Wilde's 1887 short story "The Canterville Ghost".

"Bhoothnath" was released on 9 May 2008, receiving positive reviews from critics. It was well received by audiences and popular among children, becoming a success at the box office. The performances of the main cast were praised by critics and audiences alike. A sequel titled Bhoothnath Returns, written and directed by Nitesh Tiwari, was released on 11 April 2014; it shares a remote connection with the original.

Plot 
One windy night, a young couple sneaks into the Nath Villa, a huge bungalow in Goa, only to discover that a ghost haunts the house, causing them to flee. Aditya, an engineer working on a cruise line, moves into the villa for a year along with his wife Anjali and his son Banku. The next day he bids them a brief farewell. Some more days later, one night, Banku encounters the ghost whose name is Kailash Nath. Little Banku, who is told by his mother that ghosts don't exist but angels do, considers him to be one and also nicknames him Bhoothnath. Things become comical when Banku displays no fear of him despite various attempts by Bhoothnath to scare him off and drive him out of the house. Instead the latter keeps getting pranked on by the kid and it becomes a playful fight between the two. One day, Bhoothnath tries to scare Banku again while he is on the edge of the stairs, but it instead results in startling him and causing him to fall down and sustain a head injury, much to his shock. Anjali rushes him to the hospital and Bhoothnath follows. Banku is saved, relieving both. A tearful Bhoothnath apologizes to Banku and the two become best friends. Some weeks later, Bhoothnath's son Vijay Nath returns from the United States to sell off the house. This angers the ghost as he doesn't want his home to be demolished and scares off the buyers. Banku tries to calm him down and requests him to appear before his mother. He does so, and reveals his story.
 
Years ago, Kailash had a happy family with his wife Nirmala, his son Vijay and his grandson Vibhu. Some time later, Vijay moved to the US for higher studies and later settled there, to the dismay of his parents. His mother yearned for him to visit her but he hardly contacted them. Kailash was disappointed when he arrived on the day of Nirmala's funeral and then tried to sell off the house. He turned down the buyers, angering Vijay's wife. Vijay requested his father to move with them to America, saying that nothing is left for them in the house but Kailash, who was (and still is) emotionally attached to the house, declined the offer. The next day, Vijay left with his family to the airport all the while Kailash desperately trying to convince him not to leave but he didn't listen. While on the way to follow him out of the house, Kailash tripped down the stairs. Even then he ran after Vijay to stop him but he ignored him and left. Devastated, he walked back inside the house to see his own lifeless body lying on the bottom of the stairs.

Aditya and Anjali decide to perform Bhoothnath's final rites to give him salvation. But Banku is only told that they are "celebrating his birthday" as the kid is too young to understand the meaning of the ceremony. Aditya meets Vijay and confronts him. Guilt-ridden, Vijay arrives during the ceremony and apologizes for his mistakes and tells the family that they can live permanently in the house. Bhoothnath forgives his son and is freed. Banku, seeing a tearful Bhoothnath disappear, is distraught. The next day he is  leaving for school, missing the ghost, when the two are happily reunited as Bhoothnath appears again, though he requests Banku and the viewers to hide it.

Cast 

 Amitabh Bachchan as Kailash Nath a.k.a. Bhoothnath
 Shah Rukh Khan as Aditya "Adi" Sharma
 Juhi Chawla as Anjali Sharma
 Aman Siddiqui as Aman "Banku" Sharma
 Priyanshu Chatterjee as Vijay Nath, Kailash's son
 Satish Shah as Principal J.J. Irani
 Rajpal Yadav as Anthony
 Shaana Diya as Shaana Nath, Vijay's wife
 Shrey Bawa as Vibhu Nath, Vijay's son
 Neena Kulkarni as Nirmala Nath, Kailash's wife
 Delnaaz Paul as Jojo's mother
 Ashish Chaudhary in a special appearance as Rohan Khurana
 Nauheed Cyrusi in a special appearance as Tina
 Amit Behl as Dr. Behl
 Anup Upadhyay as Teacher
 Achyut Potdar as Temple Priest
 Atul Srivastava as Jagan
 Devendra as Jojo, Aman "Banku" Sharma's friend
 Amay Kadakia as Amit

Music

All songs are composed by Vishal–Shekhar with lyrics by Javed Akhtar.

Reception
The film received generally positive response from critics. , the film holds a 60% approval rating on Rotten Tomatoes, based on five reviews with an average rating of 6.25/10. At the box office, the film had a slow opening, though it managed to gross  among its theatrical run and was declared a semi-hit by Box Office India.

Sequel
As the film finished with a "to-be-continued" ending, a sequel to Bhoothnath was expected, but there was no clear intention. Bachchan and the original production team announced a sequel, titled Bhoothnath Returns, which was co-written and directed by Nitesh Tiwari, and released on 11 April 2014. Bachchan and Khan reprised their roles, though the latter only had a cameo appearance as himself.

See also
List of ghost films
The Canterville Ghost

References

External links
 

2000s Hindi-language films
2008 films
Indian comedy horror films
Indian ghost films
Indian haunted house films
2008 comedy horror films
Films set in Goa
2008 fantasy films
Films based on The Canterville Ghost
Films scored by Vishal–Shekhar
Films directed by Vivek Sharma
Indian films with live action and animation
2008 directorial debut films
2008 comedy films